The Progressive Reform Caucus of the Chicago City Council is a bloc of aldermen in the Chicago City Council that was formed in 2013. Its stated mission statement is "creating a more just and equal Chicago, combating all forms of discrimination, and advancing public policies that offer genuine opportunity to all Chicagoans, especially those who have been left out of our society’s prosperity." It currently has 18 members, out of the council's 50 aldermen.

History 
The caucus was founded by nine aldermen in 2013, after having informally collaborated since 2012. There had been a "loose amalgamation of self-described progressives" in the council prior to this, but it had not been a formalized organization. Members of the caucus had historically been less aligned with Mayor Rahm Emanuel than average aldermen. The day after the formation of the Progressive Reform Caucus, a group of other aldermen who self-identified as progressives formed the Paul Douglas Alliance, with the goal of working in a more aligned fashion with Mayor Emanuel. 

The caucus has formed a political action committee (PAC) with the same name. As of June 2020, the largest donors to the PAC were labor unions: SEIU Illinois Council, AFSCME Illinois Council No. 31, and Chicago Teachers Union.

The chairs of the caucus have been Scott Waguespack (2015-19), Susan Sadlowski Garza (2019-20), and Sophia King (2020-present).

Membership 
During the 2015–19 term, the caucus consisted of 10 members. Two of the 10 members lost re-election in 2019, but with ten newly elected aldermen joining the caucus, membership increased to 18 at the start of the 2019–23 term.

Current members 

The following table lists current aldermen who are affiliated with the Progressive Reform Caucus. Several new aldermen who had campaigned as progressives were widely expected to join the caucus after the 2019 Chicago aldermanic election.

Past members

Agenda and actions

2019–23 City Council term 
In August 2019, ten members of the caucus urged Mayor Lori Lightfoot to address the city's budget deficit by enacting a financial transaction tax or corporate head tax, rather than increasing property taxes or making cuts to city services. A month later, they outlined the specifics of their proposal, further suggesting a tax on office leases, a hotel tax increase, a tax on vacant commercial properties, and a local income tax on those making over $100,000 a year. Furthermore, they proposed a moratorium on the Chicago Police Department budget, a moratorium on privatization of city services, an end to Tax increment financing subsidies in wealthy neighborhoods, and increased spending on affordable housing, mental health, early childhood education, and a youth jobs program. The aldermen suggested that the Progressive Caucus could act as a bloc on these issues in the upcoming budget debate.

In November 2019, in response to Mayor Lightfoot's plan for raising the minimum wage to $15 an hour by 2021, the Progressive Caucus pushed to eliminate the tipped minimum wage and allow restaurant workers and others in this category to earn the $15 minimum wage. Later that month, half of the caucus' members (La Spata, Taylor, Rodriguez, Sigcho-Lopez, Rodriguez Sanchez, Ramirez Rosa, Vasquez, Martin, and Hadden) voted against Mayor Lightfoot's proposed annual budget for 2020, which passed by a vote of 39-11.

During the COVID-19 pandemic, members of the Progressive Caucus conducted telephone check-ins with senior citizens living in their wards.

During the George Floyd protests in late May and early June 2020, the Progressive Caucus renewed calls for the City to negotiate a new contract with the Chicago Police Department that would include systematic reforms, and introduced a resolution to that effect. In July 2020, the Caucus called for an end to the $33 million contract for police officers to be present in Chicago Public Schools, and for a reinvestment of those funds in alternative strategies for school safety. Later that month, the Caucus criticized the Chicago Police Department for its actions during a July 17 protest in Grant Park and called on the Parks Department to remove the park's statue of Christopher Columbus.

See also 
 Chicago Aldermanic Black Caucus
 Chicago City Council Democratic Socialist Caucus
 Chicago City Council Latino Caucus
 Chicago City Council LGBT Caucus

References 

Progressive organizations in the United States
Issue-based groups of legislators
Caucuses of the Chicago City Council